Route 918 is a north-south regional Israeli highway in the Golan Heights.

Junctions on the route

From south to north:

Gadot junction next to Gadot with Highway 91
Gonen junction next to Gonen with Route 959
Lehavot HaBashan junction next to Lehavot HaBashan with Route 977
Access road turning east to Shamir (kibbutz)
Junction with Route 9779 turning west to Sde Nehemya and Amir
Access road to Kfar Szold
Junction with Palgei Mayim Road in She'ar Yashuv
Hurshat Tal junction near HaGoshrim and Dafna, with Highway 99.

See also
List of highways in Israel

918